Eléctrico Futebol Clube is a Portuguese football club from Ponte de Sor founded in 1929. Eléctrico Futebol Clube currently plays in the AF Portalegre 1ª Divisão district league. They currently play their home games at the Municipal de Ponte de Sor in Ponte de Sor with a capacity of 1,500.

Futsal

Eléctrico F.C. has a futsal team that plays top tier futsal in the Liga Sport Zone.

External links
 Official website
 ZeroZero Eléctrico Futebol Clube Profile
 Fora De Jogo Profile

Football clubs in Portugal
Association football clubs established in 1929
1929 establishments in Portugal